Power Move Pro Wrestling (NJPW 闘魂列伝 Toukon Retsuden or Furious Legend in Japan) is a video game developed by Yuke's Co., Ltd. and published by Tomy for the PlayStation.

Gameplay
Power Move Pro Wrestling is a pro wrestling game featuring 12 wrestlers. The original Japanese version of the game was originally a New Japan Pro-Wrestling licensed video game; due to the then-limited popularity of the promotion outside the country, an original roster of wrestlers was created for Power Move Pro Wrestling while retaining NJPW wrestler move sets.

Reception
Next Generation reviewed the PlayStation version of the game, rating it four stars out of five, and stated that "If there was a game that screamed for a WWF license and a US release, this is the one."

Next Generation reviewed the PlayStation version of the game, rating it three stars out of five, and stated that "Overall, the impact is somewhat less than what we'd hoped for from a U.S. port, but Power Move Wrestling is still a solid game and an enjoyable distraction."

Reviews
GamePro (Jan, 1997)
GameSpot - Dec 01, 1996
Game Revolution - Jan, 1997
NowGamer - Dec 20, 1996

See also

List of licensed wrestling video games
List of fighting games

References

External links 
 Power Move Pro Wrestling at GameFAQs
 Power Move Pro Wrestling at Giant Bomb
 Power Move Pro Wrestling at MobyGames

1995 video games
Activision games
Multiplayer and single-player video games
New Japan Pro-Wrestling
PlayStation (console) games
PlayStation (console)-only games
Professional wrestling games
Tomy games
Video games developed in Japan
Yuke's games